The 1977 Swedish Open was a men's tennis tournament played on outdoor clay courts held in Båstad, Sweden. It was a Two Star category tournament and part of the Grand Prix circuit. It was the 30th edition of the tournament and was held from 3 July through 10 July 1977. Second-seeded Corrado Barazzutti won the singles title.

Finals

Singles
 Corrado Barazzutti defeated  Balázs Taróczy 7–6, 6–7, 6–2
 It was Barazzutti's 2nd singles title of the year and the 3rd of his career.

Doubles
 Mark Edmondson /  John Marks defeated  Jean-Louis Haillet /  François Jauffret 6–4, 6–0

References

External links
 ITF tournament edition details

Swedish Open
Swedish Open
Swedish Open
Swedish Open